Fletcherella is a genus of moths in the family Pterophoridae.

Species
Fletcherella niphadarcha (Meyrick, 1930)
Fletcherella niphadothysana Diakonoff, 1952

Platyptiliini
Moth genera
Taxa named by Alexey Diakonoff